The Tour organisation wanted to globalize cycling by having cyclists from the Eastern Bloc in the Tour. Due to them only riding as amateurs, the 1983 Tour de France was also opened for amateur teams. In the end, only the Colombian and Portuguese national amateur teams applied for a place, and the Portuguese team later withdrew.

The 1983 Tour started with 140 cyclists, divided into 14 teams of 10 cyclists:

Start list

By team

By rider

By nationality
The 140 riders that competed in the 1983 Tour de France represented 16 different countries. Riders from eight countries won stages during the race; French riders won the largest number of stages.

Notes

References

1983 Tour de France
1983